Smart Ekiyegha-Akraka (13 April 1934 – 8 June 2016) was a Nigerian sprinter. He competed in the men's 4 × 100 metres relay at the 1960 Summer Olympics.

References

External links
 

1934 births
2016 deaths
Athletes (track and field) at the 1958 British Empire and Commonwealth Games
Athletes (track and field) at the 1960 Summer Olympics
Nigerian male sprinters
Olympic athletes of Nigeria
Commonwealth Games silver medallists for Nigeria
Commonwealth Games medallists in athletics
Medallists at the 1958 British Empire and Commonwealth Games